New Elephant Road is a business hub of Dhaka city. It is especially well known for its shops selling carpets, floor coverings, computers, computer accessories, shoes, ceramics, garments, show pieces, watches, and food. It was previously known as Laboratory Road. It connects Science Laboratory and Shahbagh.

References 

Streets in Dhaka